Tawata "George" Tiloio (Gilbertese: tə'wataː tʕe'loːjo; c. 1839 — 6 November 1944) was chief of Norauea village on the island of Marakei, Kiribati.

He accepted Congregational missionaries into his community in the 1870s who converted the people of Norauea to the church.

Tiloio is famous in Kiribati for the Rawata Pass incident of 1912 where, after conflict with neighbouring Bwainuna village about dowry for a marriage, Tiloio organised his village to obstruct the Rawata Pass with canoes. This led to the lagoon being cut off from the sea and pressure on Bwainuna to satisfy the demands of the bride's family. A canoe from the incident is displayed in the Kiribati National Cultural Centre and Museum.

Tiloio died in his village in 1944 during the Gilbert and Marshall Islands campaign of World War II. He rests in the village cemetery along with other past chiefs.

References

Further reading 
Naina, Shirley (1974). History of Marakei. Micronesia Press.
Farley, Martin (1998). Kiribati and Kiritimati in WWII. Vernon Publishing.

1839 births
People from the Gilbert Islands
1944 deaths
I-Kiribati centenarians
I-Kiribati Congregationalists
Men centenarians
Converts to Christianity